Thai tea is usually known as a Thai drink made from Ceylon black tea, milk, sugar and spices (typically cardamom and star anise). It is served either hot or cold. Thai tea is popular in Southeast Asia and is served in many restaurants that serve Thai food. When served cold it is known as Thai iced tea Although Thai tea is normally referred to Thai iced tea, there are also other kinds of tea can be referred as Thai tea. For instance, the Thai traditional herbal teas which is formulated based on Thai traditional medicine can also be called as Thai tea. Thai Oolong tea can also be referred as Thai tea which is oolong tea steamed with ginger (Zingiber officinale), lemongrass (Cymbopogon citratus), and celery.

Ingredients
The drink is made from strongly brewed Ceylon tea, or a locally grown landrace (traditional or semi-wild) version of Assam known as bai miang.

The tea is sweetened with sugar and condensed milk and served chilled. Evaporated milk, coconut milk or whole milk is poured over the tea and ice before serving to add taste and creamy appearance. In Thai restaurants, it is served in a tall glass, but when sold from street and market stalls in Thailand it may be poured over the crushed ice in a plastic bag or tall plastic cups. It may also be made into a frappé at some vendors.

Tapioca pearls can be added to Thai tea to make a bubble tea.

Variations of Thai tea

Cold
 Dark Thai iced tea – Thai tea served chilled with no milk content, sweetened with sugar only. The concept is based on traditional Indian tea, which is used as a main ingredient.
 Lime Thai tea – Similar to dark Thai iced tea, but flavored with lime and sweetened with sugar. Mint may also be added.

Hot
In Thailand, Thai hot tea is often drunk in the morning, frequently with pathongko (long strips of fried dough):

 Thai hot tea – Thai tea with sugar and milk content, served hot.
 Dark Thai hot tea – Thai tea served hot with no milk content, sweetened with sugar only.

See also 

 Milk Tea Alliance

References

External links
 
 5 Amazing Benefits of Thai Tea

Tea varieties
Tea culture
Thai cuisine
Tea by country
Milk tea
Thai drinks